Rhea Durham (born July 1, 1978) is an American model. She has appeared on the cover of several major fashion magazines, including French Vogue, Marie Claire, British and American ELLE. Rhea has also walked in the 2000 and 2001 Victoria's Secret Fashion Show. She guest-starred as herself on the 2001 Spin City episode, "The Wedding Scammer."

Personal life
Rhea started a relationship with actor and former rapper Mark Wahlberg in 2001. They have four children. They got married on August 1, 2009 in a private Catholic ceremony in Beverly Hills, California.

In 2009, she converted to Catholicism from Baptist Protestantism, having received the sacraments of initiation.

References

External links

Rhea Durham at AskMen.com

1978 births
Catholics from Florida
Converts to Roman Catholicism from Baptist denominations
Female models from Florida
Former Baptists
Living people
People from Lakeland, Florida
Wahlberg family